Myriocephalus is a genus of Australian flowering plants in the family Asteraceae.

 Species

References

Gnaphalieae
Asteraceae genera